is a video game series published in Japan by Banpresto and Bandai Namco Entertainment that began in 1990 and features 16 crossover teams between Ultraman, Kamen Rider (also known as Masked Rider) and Gundam. Characters from other franchises have also been featured in some of the initial games, as well as in the Compati Sports series, such as Mazinger Z, Getter Robo, Devilman and Godzilla.

It was the first video game series to involve a crossover between animated giant robots and live action tokusatsu heroes from different established franchises. The series makes this possible by using caricaturized versions of the characters (officially referred to as "SD" or "super deformed" characters), which allowed the different heroes and villains to co-exist and interact with each other without the need to reconcile their contrasting styles, settings, or sizes. This also made them appear cute. The first game in the series, SD Battle Ōzumō: Heisei Hero Basho for the Famicom, which mixed franchises that were originally licensed to Popy, was developed as a congratulatory present to Yukimasa Sugiura when he was promoted to president of Banpresto at the time, and was soon followed by series of spin-offs and related games featuring the same cast of characters that developed into the Compati Hero Series. The crossover was also possible due to Banpresto's parent company Bandai holding the merchandising rights for all the properties associated with the series.

The series was successful with children thanks to the SD Gundam craze, but after the release of Charinko Hero for the GameCube, there were no new games afterward for nearly eight years. Banpresto released a new game in the series titled Lost Heroes for the Nintendo 3DS and the PlayStation Portable in September 2012.

List of video games

The Great Battle
 Early games
SD Battle Ōzumō: Heisei Hero Basho (Famicom - April 20, 1990)
SD Hero Sōkessen: Taose! Aku no Gundam (Famicom - July 7, 1990)
Shuffle Fight (Famicom - October 9, 1992)
 Main series
SD The Great Battle (Super Famicom - December 29, 1990)
The Great Battle II: Last Fighter Twin (Super Famicom - March 27, 1992)
The Great Battle III (Super Famicom - March 26, 1993)
The Great Battle IV (Super Famicom - December 17, 1994)
The Great Battle V (Super Famicom - December 22, 1995)
The Great Battle VI (PlayStation - April 11, 1997)
The Great Battle Pocket (Game Boy Color - December 3, 1999) (developed by Alpha Unit)
Great Battle Fullblast (PlayStation Portable - March 1, 2012)
Lost Heroes (Nintendo 3DS, PlayStation Portable - September 6, 2012)
Lost Heroes 2 (Nintendo 3DS - February 2, 2015)
 Gaiden series
Tekkyu Fight! The Great Battle Gaiden (Game Boy - July 30, 1993)
The Great Battle Gaiden 2: Matsuri da Wasshoi (Super Famicom - January 28, 1994)
 Derivative games
Great Battle Cyber (Famicom - December 25, 1992)
Super Iron Ball Fight! (Super Famicom - September 15, 1995)
Battle Crusher (Game Boy - January 27, 1995)
Battle Pinball (Super Famicom - February 24, 1995)
Ganbare! Compati Heroes Bokurano (Sega Pico - April, 1996)
Battle Formation (PlayStation - November 13, 1997)
Tokusatsu Bouken Katsugeki Super Hero Retsuden (Dreamcast - July 27, 2000)
Heroes' VS (PlayStation Portable - February 7, 2013)

Compati Sports Series
 Individual games
Versus Hero: Road to the King Fight (Game Boy - August 7, 1992)
Battle Baseball (Famicom - February 19, 1993)
Battle Racers (Super Famicom - March 17, 1995)
Charinko Hero (GameCube - July 17, 2003)
 Battle Dodgeball series
Battle Dodge Ball (Super Famicom - July 20, 1991)
Battle Dodge Ball (Game Boy - October 16, 1992)
Battle Dodge Ball II (Super Famicom - July 23, 1993)
Battle Dodge Ball III (PlayStation Portable - March 1, 2012)
 Battle Soccer series
Battle Soccer: Field no Hasha (Super Famicom - December 11, 1992)
Battle Soccer 2 (Super Famicom - November 25, 1994)
 Super Pachinko Taisen series
Super Pachinko Taisen (Super Famicom - April 28, 1995)
Super Pachinko Taisen (Game Boy - June 30, 1995)

RPG
Hero Senki: Project Olympus (Super Famicom - November 20, 1992) (developed by Winkysoft)
Gaia Saver (Super Famicom - January 28, 1994) (developed by Arc System Works)
Super Hero Operations (PlayStation - January 28, 1999)
Super Hero Operations: Diedal's Ambition (PlayStation - November 22, 2000)
Super Tokusatsu Taisen 2001 (Playstation - September 6, 2001)
Super Hero Generation (PlayStation 3 & PlayStation Vita - October 23, 2014)

Notes

References

External links
Official web portal 
Compati Heroes Series listing at Giant Bomb
Fighter Roar at Giant Bomb

1990 video games
Banpresto games
Bandai Namco Entertainment franchises
Crossover video games
Japan-exclusive video games
Video game franchises
Video games developed in Japan
Ultra Series video games
Kamen Rider video games
Gundam video games